The Men's 4 x 200 metre freestyle relay event at the 2013 Southeast Asian Games took place on 12 December 2013 at Wunna Theikdi Aquatics Centre.

There were 5 teams who took part in this event. Singapore won the gold medal, Malaysia and Indonesia won the silver and bronze medal respectively.

Schedule
All times are Myanmar Standard Time (UTC+06:30)

Records

Results

References

External links

Swimming at the 2013 Southeast Asian Games